This article shows the rosters of all participating teams at the women's goalball tournament at the 2012 Summer Paralympics in London.

Pool A

The following is the Brazil roster in the women's goalball tournament of the 2012 Summer Paralympics.

The following is the China roster in the women's goalball tournament of the 2012 Summer Paralympics.

The following is the Denmark roster in the women's goalball tournament of the 2012 Summer Paralympics.

The following is the Finland roster in the women's goalball tournament of the 2012 Summer Paralympics.

The following is the Great Britain roster in the women's goalball tournament of the 2012 Summer Paralympics.

Pool B

The following is the Australia roster in the women's goalball tournament of the 2012 Summer Paralympics.

The following is the Canada roster in the women's goalball tournament of the 2012 Summer Paralympics.

The following is the Japan roster in the women's goalball tournament of the 2012 Summer Paralympics.

The following is the Sweden roster in the women's goalball tournament of the 2012 Summer Paralympics.

The following is the American roster in the women's goalball tournament of the 2012 Summer Paralympics.

See also
Goalball at the 2012 Summer Paralympics – Men's team rosters

References

2
Women's team rosters
2012 in women's sport